This is a round-up of the 1985 Sligo Intermediate Football Championship. Shamrock Gaels recovered from the embarrassment of the previous year's final to claim the 1985 title, and thus become the first team to win the Championship twice, in addition to being the very first winners in 1979.

Quarter finals

Semi-finals

Championship final

Sligo Intermediate Football Championship
Sligo Intermediate Football Championship